Lilian Brassier (born 2 November 1999) is a French professional footballer who plays as a defender for Ligue 1 club Brest.

Club career
In the week of 20 June 2019, Brassier signed a professional contract with Rennes and immediately went on loan with Valenciennes. He made his professional debut with Valenciennes in a 1–1 Ligue 2 tie with Nancy on 2 August 2019.

In 2020, Brassier signed for Brest on loan with an option to buy if the club stayed up in Ligue 1. The deal was made permanent after Brest secured safety on the final matchday of the season.

International career
Born in France, Brassier is of Togolese descent. He is a youth international for France.

References

External links
 
 
 FFF Profile

Living people
1999 births
Sportspeople from Argenteuil
French sportspeople of Togolese descent
French footballers
Footballers from Val-d'Oise
Association football defenders
France youth international footballers
Ligue 1 players
Ligue 2 players
Valenciennes FC players
Stade Brestois 29 players